The 1999 Heineken Trophy was a tennis tournament played on outdoor grass courts at Autotron park in Rosmalen, 's-Hertogenbosch, Netherlands that was part of the International Series of the 1999 ATP Tour and Tier III of the 1999 WTA Tour. The tournament was held from 14 June through 19 June 1999. Patrick Rafter and Kristina Brandi won the singles titles.

Finals

Men's singles

 Patrick Rafter defeated  Andrei Pavel, 3–6, 7–6(9–7), 6–4

Women's singles

 Kristina Brandi defeated  Silvija Talaja, 6–0, 3–6, 6–1
 It was Brandi's only singles title.

Men's doubles

 Leander Paes /  Jan Siemerink  vs.  Ellis Ferreira /  David Rikl, final cancelled due to rain

Women's doubles

 Silvia Farina /  Rita Grande defeated  Cara Black /  Kristie Boogert, 7–5, 7–6(7–2)

WTA entrants

Seeds

Other entrants
The following players received wildcards into the singles main draw:
  Sandra Kleinová
  Karina Habšudová

External links
 

Heineken Trophy
Rosmalen Grass Court Championships
1999 in Dutch tennis